Dusk is a studio album by American jazz pianist Andrew Hill recorded in 1999 and released on the Palmetto label.

Reception

The Allmusic review by David R. Adler awarded the album 4½ stars and stated "With Dusk, Andrew Hill makes it plain that his uncompromising musical vision is intact, undiluted, and perhaps more advanced than ever".

Track listing

All compositions by Andrew Hill
 "Dusk" - 12:05
 "ML" - 4:10
 "Ball Square" - 4:25
 "Tough Love" - 7:19
 "Sept" - 12:27  
 "T.C." - 7:54
 "15/8" - 10:31
 "Focus" - 0:52

Recorded on September 15 (tracks 1-3 & 5-7) and October 27 (tracks 4 & 8), 1999.

Personnel
Andrew Hill - piano
Marty Ehrlich - bass clarinet (track 2), alto saxophone (tracks 1, 3 & 5-7)
Greg Tardy - bass clarinet (track 2), tenor saxophone (tracks 1, 3 & 5-7)
Ron Horton - trumpet (tracks 1-3 & 5-7)
Scott Colley - bass (tracks 1-3 & 5-7) 
Billy Drummond - drums (tracks 1-3 & 5-7)

References

Palmetto Records albums
Andrew Hill albums
2000 albums